Weston and Ellington were a prolific Detroit based architectural firm operating in the 1910s and 1920s. They designed numerous apartment buildings, offices, auto sales buildings and other commercial structures, mostly in and around the city of Detroit.

Weston & Ellington were one of the many firms that employed Detroit architectural sculptor Corrado Parducci.

Selected commissions
All commissions are located in Detroit, Michigan, unless otherwise stated.

Delta Tau Delta Fraternity House, Ann Arbor, Michigan – 1924
Metropolitan Building – 1925
Hotel Fort Wayne – 1926
The Wardell (listed on the National Register of Historic Places) – 1926
The Price [Macomb Daily] Building, Mount Clemens, Michigan – 1928
New Light Baptist Church (formerly Nardin Park Methodist Church) – 1929
Cadillac Casket Company Building
St. Peter's Parish House

Sources and references

 The Recent Work of Weston & Ellington: Architects & Engineers, Detroit Michigan,  1928

External links
 New Light Baptist Church (photo)

Architecture firms of the United States